Pseudopusula antillarum is a species of small sea snail, a marine gastropod mollusk in the family Triviidae, the false cowries or Cleotrivias.

Description 
The maximum recorded shell length is 6 mm.

Habitat 
Minimum recorded depth is 9 m. Maximum recorded depth is 525 m.

References

 Fehse D. & Grego J. (2017). Contributions to the knowledge of the Triviidae, XXXV. A new species in the genus Cleotrivia Iredale, 1930 from the Galápagos Archipelago (Mollusca: Gastropoda). Conchylia. 48(1-2): 3-7

External links
 Schilder F.A. (1922). Contributions to the knowledge of the genera Cypraea and Trivia. Proceedings of the Malacological Society of London. 15: 98-122

Triviidae
Gastropods described in 1922